The Abendsonne was a motorcycle manufactured in Darmstadt Germany in 1933-1934 by Georg Wessbinder. The most unusual feature was the coupling of two 98cc Villiers engines to make a 196cc twin-cylinder engine. Very few were made.

References

Motorcycle manufacturers of Germany